East Cobb is an unincorporated community in Cobb County, Georgia, United States, with a population of 175,890 people. It is an affluent northern suburb of Atlanta.

History
The area was developed as a suburb of Atlanta beginning in the 1960s. In contrast to other northern suburbs of Atlanta, East Cobb has remained unincorporated. Residents of East Cobb typically hold a Marietta address, although they are outside Marietta city boundaries.

The idea of incorporating East Cobb as a city was suggested in 2009 by the organization "Citizens for the City of East Cobb". Yet the first serious discussion of incorporating East Cobb was initiated in 1998 by then Cobb County chairman Bill Byrne. Under Byrne's proposal, the city's boundary lines would be drawn by the Cobb Legislative Delegation, the county government would continue to provide water, sewer, police and fire services to the city for a nominal fee of one dollar per year, and the city would be governed by an elected mayor and five City Council members, with wards drawn by the Cobb Delegation. However, Byrne was defeated by Cobb County Chairman Incumbent Tim Lee, who dismissed the idea of incorporating East Cobb as "solution looking for a problem."

In March 2019, Matt Dollar, a local representative in the Georgia House of Representatives announced that he would be submitting a bill to create the legislation necessary for East Cobb cityhood. The bill could not be approved by the legislature or by referendum until 2020; the Georgia Senate passed the measure on February 10, 2022, setting up a referendum vote by East Cobb residents in May 2022. If East Cobb were to incorporate as a city, it would be the largest in the county and the second largest in metro Atlanta (behind Atlanta), with around 150,000 residents. The referendum vote failed with 73% no votes, effectively precluding East Cobb cityhood.

Geography 
East Cobb is roughly bounded by:
 Cherokee County to the north
 Willeo Creek and Roswell in Fulton County to the northeast
 the Chattahoochee River and Sandy Springs in Fulton County to the southeast
 Bell's Ferry Road, I-575, and the Marietta city limits to the west, and
 Interstate 285 and the Cumberland/Galleria edge city at the southern tip.

East Cobb is within the Northeast Cobb census county division.

Climate
East Cobb has a humid subtropical climate (Köppen climate classification Cfa). The climate is slightly cooler than other areas of the metro with a higher elevation, predominately above  in most areas. Two of the largest snowfalls historically in East Cobb were the 1993 Storm of the Century and the storm on 7 and 8 December in 2017.

Economy

Shopping
Merchant's Walk is a  open-air shopping center with retailers, restaurants, and a movie theater originally built in 1976 and since expanded and twice renovated, once in the early 1990s and again in 2008–2011.

The Avenue East Cobb is a  open-air shopping center. It has a horseshoe-shaped form and a "period-style Main Street design" and "town square" concepts, according to its designers.

Paper Mill Village is a collection of 33 buildings linked by over a mile of pedestrian walkways. The Village includes retail tenants, restaurant tenants, and service provider tenants.

Arts and culture 

Taste of East Cobb is an annual event.

The YMCA operates the McKlesky Family-East Cobb YMCA, a recreational area for the community.

Civic associations include a Kiwanis Club and a Rotary Club.

Cobb County Public Library operates the East Cobb Library.

Parks and recreation
East Cobb Park, established in 2001, East Cobb Parks hosts two playgrounds, walking trails, a bandstand, picnic pavilions, and stream overlooks.

Fuller's Park, which hosts baseball fields, a football field, a playground, and an indoor gymnasium used for recreational activities.
Harrison Park, which hosts baseball fields, a tennis court, and playground.
Mabry Park, which hosts a playground and walking trails.

Government
East Cobb comprises districts 2 and 3 of the Cobb County Commission.

Education 
Public schools in East Cobb are part of the Cobb County School District. The area comprises several high school attendance districts: Pope, Sprayberry, Wheeler, Kell, Walton, and Lassiter. The western half of the Kell district lies outside of East Cobb. The extreme western portion of the Sprayberry district (the Town Center Mall area) also lies outside of East Cobb. The extreme southwestern and southern portions of the Wheeler district lie west of I-75 and south of I-285 respectively, thus excluding these small areas from being considered a part of East Cobb.

The area known as East Cobb comprises the following middle school districts: Daniell, McCleskey, Simpson, Hightower Trail, Mabry, East Cobb, Dodgen, and Dickerson (small portions of the Daniell and East Cobb Middle School districts lie outside of East Cobb; a sliver of the eastern portion of the Palmer Middle School district can be considered a part of East Cobb).

Media
The paper-only weekly East Cobb Neighbor has a circulation of around 44,000.

Infrastructure
Cobb County operates the East Cobb Government Service Center, which contains a county police precinct, a Cobb Fire and Emergency Services station, and a license plate Office.

Notable people

Alton Brown, food and media personality
Blaine Boyer, professional baseball player
Brett Butler, comedian
Bobby Cox, former manager of the Atlanta Braves
Missy Elliott, musician
Newt Gingrich, Former Speaker of the House of Representatives, 2012 Republican presidential candidate
Ariel Gurian, former news anchor for The Onion, former WAGA Fox 5 News reporter
Johnny Isakson, United States Senator
Lester Maddox, former restaurant owner and governor of Georgia; resided in East Cobb before his death
Ty Pennington, Sprayberry High graduate, Extreme Home Makeover and Trading Spaces
Cody Rhodes, professional wrestler
Chris Robinson and Rich Robinson of The Black Crowes
Tony Schiavone, former announcer for WCW, radio sports announcer, producer, engineer, currently announcer for All Elite Wrestling
Travis Tritt, country music star
Lawson Vaughn, professional soccer player
T. J. Yates, NFL quarterback

See also
 Chattahoochee Plantation, Georgia - a former city and currently unincorporated area in southeastern East Cobb bordering the Chattahoochee River and Sandy Springs in Fulton County, Georgia.

References

Unincorporated communities in Cobb County, Georgia
Unincorporated communities in Georgia (U.S. state)
Georgia populated places on the Chattahoochee River